Travis Schuldt (born September 18, 1974) is an American actor. He originated the role of Ethan Winthrop on Passions, and played the recurring roles of Keith Dudemeister on Scrubs, Rick/Subway on Community, and Ben Smith on It's Always Sunny in Philadelphia.

Personal life
Schuldt was born in Topeka, Kansas. He became engaged to actress Natalie Zea after eleven years together, in June 2013. The couple married on July 16, 2014, in Hawaii. In June 2015, they announced that they were expecting their first child together. In October 2015, Zea gave birth to a daughter.

Career
His theatre credits include Glengarry Glen Ross, The Taming of the Shrew, Macbeth, and The Madwoman of Chaillot. Schuldt co-produced and starred in Sam Shepard's Icarus's Mother, James Kerwin's adaptations of Shakespeare's Venus and Adonis and Cardenio, and Amber Benson's Albert Hall.

Schuldt's first major television role was on the NBC soap opera Passions, in which he originated the role of Ethan Crane, before leaving the series at the end of his three-year contract in 2002. He played the recurring role of Keith Dudemeister on Scrubs from 2006 to 2009. He also has made appearances on other television shows, such as Veronica Mars, My Boys, True Jackson, VP, and Rules of Engagement, and was a regular on the ABC police drama 10-8: Officers on Duty from 2003 to 2004. He appeared in the 2007 horror films The Hitcher and Hack!.

In 2008, he appeared in the original pilot for the ABC sitcom Cavemen, as well as in an episode of the CBS sitcom The Big Bang Theory. That same year, Schuldt had roles in the comedy films Private Valentine: Blonde & Dangerous alongside Jessica Simpson and An American Carol. In October 2009, he guest-starred on the Fringe episode "Dream Logic" and the It's Always Sunny in Philadelphia episodes "The Gang Wrestles for the Troops", "The D.E.N.N.I.S. System", "Mac's Big Break", and "Dee Gives Birth" as recurring character Ben Smith. In March 2012, he guest-starred as Subway/Rick on the Community episode "Digital Exploration of Interior Design". Schuldt reprised his role on the season six episode "Advanced Safety Features" in April 2015. In November 2017, it was announced Schuldt would guest-star on General Hospital.

Filmography

References

External links
 

1974 births
20th-century American male actors
21st-century American male actors
Actors from Topeka, Kansas
American male film actors
American male soap opera actors
American male stage actors
American male television actors
Living people
American people of German descent
Male actors from Kansas
Texas Christian University alumni